R J Dent is an English writer of fiction and non-fiction.

Work
His stories, poems and essays have appeared in publications including Writer’s Muse, Orbis, Chanticleer, Agenda, Panda, Roundyhouse, Quazen, Authspot, and Philosophy Now.

His first novel, Myth, is a dark fantasy/horror story set on a Greek island. It was published in July 2006.

He has translated Le Comte de Lautréamont's The Songs of Maldoror, Charles Baudelaire's The Flowers of Evil, and Alcaeus's Poems & Fragments into English.

Bibliography

Novels
Myth (2006)

Short stories
A Triumph (2002) Writer's Muse
Jordy Michaels Leaps the Great Divide (2004) Philosophy Now
More to the Picture (2006) Writer's Muse
Chest of Wonders (2006) Express Art Gallery
Mimique (2007) AWEN
9/11 Considered as the First Turn in a Game of Darts (2007) Authspot
The Purple Butterfly (2008) Writer's Muse
For Heart's Sake (2008) Authspot
Yellow Bandana (2008) Authspot
The Short Story (2008) Writinghood
Tally (2008) Authspot
Windows (2008) Authspot
On The Bus (2008) Authspot
The Six Letters of Henry VIII (2008) Authspot
Echoes (2008) Authspot

Translations

Alcaeus: Poems and Fragments (2012)
Comte de Lautréamont: The Songs of Maldoror (2011)
Charles Baudelaire: The Flowers of Evil (2009)

Essays

A Collaboration of Unlike Minds: Robert Graves’ and William Blake’s The Tyger (2006) Roundyhouse
You who magically make supple the old bones of the after-hours drunkard trampled by the horses’ – an essay on translating (2006) Agenda
Violence and exquisite beauty – the aesthetics of Roy Campbell (2006) Agenda
J. G. Ballard and the fiction of enclosed space (2007) Quazen
The Life, Death and Afterlife of Richard Bachman(2007) Quazen

Poetry collections

Moonstone Silhouettes

As Contributor

 Sade: Sex and Death - Essays on the Marquis De Sade
 The Blood Delirium: The Vampire in 19th Century Literature
 'Introduction: The Rolling Stones and Jeremy Reed' in Voodoo Excess: Rolling with the Stones by Jeremy Reed

References

R J Dent - http://www.rjdent.com
Myth - https://web.archive.org/web/20070207130542/http://www.rjdent.com/novels.htm
Jordy Michaels Leaps the Great Divide - http://www.philosophynow.org/issues
A Collaboration of Unlike Minds: Robert Graves’ and William Blake's The Tyger - http://www.rjdent.com/thetyger.htm

External links
 Official website

English writers
Living people
Year of birth missing (living people)